Xuyi High School is a school in Huaian of Jiangsu province, China.

The school was established in 1920, and was the first county middle school of Huaian City. Its predecessor was Anhui Provincial Ninth Middle School.

The school is one of the 95 key middle schools firstly-confirmed in Jiangsu Province, and is also the four-star high school passing through the acceptance in Jiangsu Province.

Xuyi High School is located in the First Mountain National Forest Park, and is the only key middle school built on the top of the mountain in Jiangsu Province.

There are several running schools located in the First Mountain region: There are many academies, such as Huaishan Academy, Chongsheng Academy, Dengying Academy and Jingyi Academy.

The school has a library, which passed the acceptance of first-rate library in 2002. The school also has a large playground.

References 

 Xuyi High School Bar
 Xuyi High School in Jiangsu Province

Schools in Jiangsu
Educational institutions established in 1920
1920 establishments in China